Ayman Al-Hindi (born 5 January 1986) is a Palestinian  football midfielder, who plays for Palestine football club Gaza Sports. He plays on a central and left midfield position. 

Al-Hindi captained the senior Palestine national football team through its first competitive international played within the West Bank, a 1–1 draw with Jordan.

References

External links

1986 births
Living people
Palestinian footballers
Palestine international footballers
Arab people of Indian descent
India–State of Palestine relations
Footballers at the 2006 Asian Games
Association football wingers
Asian Games competitors for Palestine
People from Jericho
Gaza Strip Premier League players
West Bank Premier League players